"Our God" is a song written by Chris Tomlin, Jesse Reeves, Jonas Myrin, and Matt Redman. The track was originally included on Passion: Awakening, a live record from Passion 10, the 2010 gathering of the Passion Conferences. It was released as a single and spent 10 weeks as No. 1 on Billboard Christian charts. The song is also the opening track on Tomlin's album And If Our God Is For Us... (2010) by CCM. 
In 2011, Chris Tomlin recorded a remake with the famous Christian rapper, Lecrae.

One of Tomlin's co-writers Matt Redman recorded a version of the song on his 2012 compilation album, Sing Like Never Before: The Essential Collection.

Awards
At the 2011 Dove Awards, Tomlin was nominated for Song of the Year, and won Worship Song of the Year for "Our God". Tomlin also performed the song at the awards ceremony.

That same year, And If Our God Is For Us... containing the song as its major hit was nominated in the category of Top Christian Album, the song won the title of Top Christian Song, and Tomlin won Top Christian Artist at the Billboard Music Awards.

"Our God" is the No. 5 song on CCLI's Top 25 Songs.

Decade-end charts

References

2010 songs
Chris Tomlin songs
Songs written by Chris Tomlin
Songs written by Jonas Myrin
Songs written by Ed Cash
Sparrow Records singles